Dirk Muschiol (born 13 April 1969) is a former professional German footballer.

Muschiol made 55 appearances in the 2. Bundesliga for SpVgg Blau-Weiß 1890 Berlin and Tennis Borussia Berlin during his playing career.

References

External links 
 

1969 births
Living people
German footballers
Association football defenders
2. Bundesliga players
Tennis Borussia Berlin players
Füchse Berlin Reinickendorf players